QFBA is the educational arm of the Qatar Financial Centre Authority. It is aimed at entry-level to senior executive professionals, instructing them in financial disciplines within the banking, asset management, capital markets and insurance sectors. It intends to increase the capacity of and support the creation of financial services expertise concerning the financial sector of Qatar. This is linked to the Human Development pillar of Qatar Vision 2030, attempting to transform Qatar into a knowledge-based economy.

Educational partners and certifying bodies

 The Chartered Institute for Securities and Investment (CISI) offers teaching and development to financial professionals.  
 Chartered Insurance Institute (CII)
 Faculty of Islamic Studies
 ICMA Centre at Henley Business School a part of the Henley Business School and University of Reading.
 International Management & Finance Academy (IMFA), a regional, non-profit, non-governmental institution with a particular focus on banking.
 NYSE Euronext, created by the merger of NYSE Group and Euronext in 2007. They operate the world's largest exchange group. In 2009, NYSE Euronext partnered with Qatar Investment Authority to form the Qatar Exchange, successor to Doha Securities Market.
 Northumbria University Newcastle

Location 
QFBA is housed inside the Qatar Financial Centre (Tower 2) situated in West Bay, Doha. The academy occupies five floors which include administration offices, a trading floor simulation room run by Thomson Reuters and coaching pods and conference facilities.

References 

1. QFMA Launches Academic Program For Financial Services Professionals Subject To Licensing – Zawya, November 2011

2. The Growing Need for Education in Islamic Finance – Islamic Finance News, June 2011

3. Sheikh Nawaf Nasser Bin Khaled Al-Thani to inaugurate first edition of Financial Thought Leaders Summit in Doha – AMEInfo.com, April 2011

4. Qatar Education receives strong endorsement – AMEInfo.com, April 2011

5. QFC Regulatory Authority brings regulatory experts to Qatar – Doha.biz, March 2011

6. Gulf States Seek to Nurture Homegrown M.B.A.'s – The New York Times, March 2011

7. 'Back to school' for Qatar oil and gas finance professionals this week – AMEInfo.com, January 2011

8. Qatar Financial Centre Authority website

9. Qatar Foundation and QFC Authority partner to establish new finance and business academy – Qatar Foundation News, May 2009

10. Academy for finance, business to be launched – Gulf Times, 21 May 2009

11. QFBA to launch in October 09 – AMEinfo, 9 June 2009

12. Finance academy set to launch courses in October – Gulf Times, 9 June 2009

13. QFBA setting up mock trade room to train Gulf investors –  Gulf Times, 14 July 2009

14. Qatar emerging as a key financial center in the Gulf – Washington Times Global, 23 Sept 2009

15. Barclays to be founding sponsor of Qatar Finance and Business Academy – AMEinfo.com, 24 Oct 2010

External links 
 Official website of the QFBA
 Qatar Financial Centre Authority
 Qatar Foundation for Education, Science and Community

Financial services companies established in 2009
Education companies established in 2009
Educational institutions established in 2009
Educational organisations based in Qatar
Financial services companies of Qatar
2009 establishments in Qatar